Ali Baghbanbashi (‎; 6 September 1924 – 28 October 2021) was an Iranian long-distance runner who competed in the 1952 Summer Olympics and in the 1956 Summer Olympics, and also in the 1951 Asian Games and 1958 Asian Games. He was born in Torghabeh, Iran, and specialized in the 3000 metres, 5000 metres, 10000 metres, and marathon.

References

1924 births
2021 deaths
Sportspeople from Mashhad
Iranian male marathon runners
Iranian male long-distance runners
Olympic athletes of Iran
Athletes (track and field) at the 1952 Summer Olympics
Athletes (track and field) at the 1956 Summer Olympics
Asian Games gold medalists for Iran
Asian Games silver medalists for Iran
Asian Games bronze medalists for Iran
Asian Games medalists in athletics (track and field)
Athletes (track and field) at the 1951 Asian Games
Athletes (track and field) at the 1958 Asian Games
Medalists at the 1951 Asian Games
Medalists at the 1958 Asian Games
Iranian male steeplechase runners
20th-century Iranian people